Billy Davis may refer to:

Billy Davis (songwriter) (1932–2004), American songwriter, record producer, and singer
Billy Davis (guitarist) (born 1938), American guitarist, member of Hank Ballard & The Midnighters
Billy Davis Jr. (born 1938), American singer, member of the group The 5th Dimension
Billy Davis (American football coach) (born 1965), American football coach in the NFL
Billy Davis (wide receiver) (born 1972), former professional American football player
Billy Davis (Mississippi politician)  (born 1938), candidate for Vice President of the United States, 1984, with Lyndon LaRouche
Billy Davis (Arizona politician) (born 1945), former Arizona State Senator
Billy Wayne Davis, American stand-up comedian

See also
Billy Davies (born 1964), Scottish football manager and former player
William Davis (disambiguation)